Samsaram is a 1951 Indian Tamil-language drama film directed by Chandru and produced by S. S. Vasan. A remake of the 1950 Telugu film of the same name, it stars M. K. Radha, Pushpavalli, Kumari Vanaja, Sriram, M. S. Sundari Bai, T. R. Ramachandran, D. Balasubramaniam, R. Balasubramaniam, K. N. Kamalam, and Kamalaveni Ammal. The film was simultaneously filmed in Hindi as Sansar, which Vasan directed.

Plot 

A struggling clerk lives with his wife and two children. Their blissful life is threatened with the arrival of his scheming mother and sister.  A short time later, the clerk disappears, abandoning his family, and his brother comes to their rescue. Exploiting the fragile situation, mischief makers suggest an immoral relationship between the clerk's brother and wife. Frustrated, the clerk's wife sends her two children to beg on the streets. Several years later, the elder of the two children, now working in a mill, meets a bearded beggar who, unknown to him, is actually his father. He obtains his father a job in the mill, and the family later reunites.

Cast

Production 
S. S. Vasan, the owner of Gemini Studios, screened the Telugu film Samsaram for his staff, family and friends. Impressed with the film, he bought the rights to remake it in two languages: Tamil and Hindi. The Tamil remake shared its title with the Telugu film, while the Hindi version was titled Sansar. Both versions were launched simultaneously; Chandru, the chief editor of Gemini, directed the Tamil version. Because South Indians actors of the era could not speak Hindi fluently, Vasan had the voices of the South Indian cast dubbed for Sansar, which he directed.

Soundtrack 
Emani Sankara Sastry was the music director, and his work was supervised by M. D. Parthasarathy. Kothamangalam Subbu wrote the lyrics. A. M. Rajah made his singing debut with this film, and his song "Samsaram... Samsaram..." became a breakthrough in his career.

Samsaram (Tamil)

Sansar (Hindi)

Reception 
Both Samsaram and Sansar were released in 1951 and became commercially successful. According to film historian Randor Guy, the success of the former was attributed to its "emotionally strong and sentimental storyline", elements, and the performances of Radha, Pushpavalli, Sriram, Vanaja, Sundari Bai and Ramachandran. However, journalist Kalki Krishnamurthy gave the film a negative review in his magazine Kalki, where he criticised the song "Amma Pasikkuthey, Thaaye Pasikkuthey" by arguing that "no mother would ever stoop to that level". In Japan, the film was released under the title Such Is Life. The story of Samsaram was again reused in Tamil as Thunai Iruppal Meenakshi.

References

Bibliography

External links 

1950s Hindi-language films
1950s multilingual films
1950s Tamil-language films
1951 drama films
1951 films
Films directed by S. S. Vasan
Gemini Studios films
Hindi remakes of Telugu films
Indian black-and-white films
Indian drama films
Indian multilingual films
Tamil remakes of Telugu films